The second and final season of the American streaming television series Luke Cage, which is based on the Marvel Comics character of the same name, sees Cage become a hero and celebrity in Harlem after clearing his name, only to face a new threat. It is set in the Marvel Cinematic Universe (MCU), sharing continuity with the films and other television series of the franchise. The season was produced by Marvel Television in association with ABC Studios, with Cheo Hodari Coker serving as showrunner.

Mike Colter stars as Cage, alongside returning principal cast members Simone Missick, Theo Rossi, and Alfre Woodard. They are joined by Gabrielle Dennis and Mustafa Shakir, with Jessica Henwick, Finn Jones, and Stephen Rider reprising their roles from other Marvel/Netflix series; Rosario Dawson also returns in a guest role. The season was ordered in December 2016, and filmed in New York City from June to November 2017. Coker again emphasized music in the season: Adrian Younge and Ali Shaheed Muhammad returned to compose the original score, using blues and reggae to represent the conflict between the Stokes family and Shakir's Bushmaster; the season again features performances from various artists; and each episode is named after a Pete Rock & CL Smooth song. Reg E. Cathey has a recurring role as Cage's father in one of his last performances, and the season is dedicated to his memory.

The season premiered on June 21, 2018, before all 13 episodes were released on Netflix on June 22. It was widely praised as better than the first season, particularly for its narrative and cast—Woodard's performance especially—though there was again some criticism for its pacing. Netflix canceled the series on October 19, 2018.

Episodes

Cast and characters

Main
 Mike Colter as Luke Cage
 Simone Missick as Mercedes "Misty" Knight
 Theo Rossi as Hernan "Shades" Alvarez
 Gabrielle Dennis as Tilda Johnson
 Mustafa Shakir as John "Bushmaster" McIver
 Alfre Woodard as Mariah Stokes-Dillard

Featured

 Jessica Henwick as Colleen Wing
 Finn Jones as Danny Rand / Iron Fist
 Stephen Rider as Blake Tower

Recurring
 Reg E. Cathey as James Lucas
 Ron Cephas Jones as Bobby Fish
 Peter Jay Fernandez as Tom Ridenhour
 Dorian Crossmon Missick as Dontrell "Cockroach" Hamilton
 Kevin Mambo as Sheldon
 Thomas Q. Jones as Darius "Comanche" Jones
 Jeremiah Richard Craft as D.W. Griffith
 Chaz Lamar Shepherd as Raymond "Piranha" Jones
 Sean Ringgold as Sugar
 Tarah Rodgers as Stephanie / Billie
 Sahr Ngaujah as Paul "Anansi" Mackintosh
 Danny Johnson as Ben Donovan
 Antonique Smith as Nandi Tyler
 Justin Swain as Mark Bailey
 Heather Alicia Simms as Ingrid Mackintosh
 John Clarence Stewart as Alex Wesley
 Karen Pittman as Priscilla Ridley

Notable guests

 Rosario Dawson as Claire Temple
 Elden Henson as Foggy Nelson
 Frank Whaley as Rafael Scarfe
 Darius Kaleb as Lonnie Wilson
 Tijuana Ricks as Thembi Wallace
 Jade Wu as Connie Lin
 Andrew Pang as Chang
 Joniece Abbott-Pratt as Etta Lucas
 Rob Morgan as Turk Barrett
 LaTanya Richardson Jackson as "Mama Mabel" Stokes
 Curtiss Cook as "Pistol Pete" Stokes
 Henry Yuk as Hai-Qing Yang
 Jayden D. Brown as Cornell "Cottonmouth" Stokes
 Ninja Devoe as Aisha Axton
 Cassandra Freeman as Patricia Wilson
 Sedly Bloomfield as Joel Spurlock

Production

Development
In January 2015, Netflix CCO Ted Sarandos stated the series was "eligible to go into multiple seasons for sure" and Netflix would look at "how well [they] are addressing both the Marvel fanbase but also the broader fanbase" in terms of determining if additional seasons would be appropriate. In July 2015, Sarandos said some of the Defenders series would "selectively have multiple seasons as they come out of the gate." Regarding a second season, showrunner Cheo Hodari Coker stated he had "a few ideas", including possibly exploring the "Hero for Hire" aspect of Luke Cage, though noted he was not taking "any of this for granted" in terms of feeling a second season renewal from Netflix was guaranteed. Actor Mike Colter also felt "Heroes for Hire" could be explored in future seasons, as well as further exploring Cage's lifestyle change regarding his relationship with Jessica Jones and introducing the couple's daughter. In December 2016, Netflix renewed the series for a second season, of 13 episodes.

Coker compared the season to A Tribe Called Quest's second album The Low End Theory saying, their first album People's Instinctive Travels and the Paths of Rhythm "was great, but then Low End Theory was the record that everyone says ... when they think of A Tribe Called Quest taking it to the next level. That’s my hope for season 2, is that we have some of the similar sounds, but we go in a deeper direction." Coker also noted that music would continue to be an important element for the season and that Harlem would still be "at the heart and its center" for the series.

Writing
In July 2017, Colter said the writing for the season was different from the first, because "we know the show now. We know the world that we’re in and we know sort of what works and what doesn’t work and we’re just gonna double down on that stuff, so look forward to a very exciting and very relevant and pop culture-heavy show." He added that after the first season and the crossover miniseries The Defenders, Cage would have "a whole new outlook on life" and would not be dealing with the judicial system anymore. Coker explained that the storyline for the season did not come from any particular iteration of the comics, and instead was based on the characters that appear: "who is Luke Cage and getting much deeper into that, but also finding out different things about Mariah Dillard, also finding out things about Misty Knight," including getting her mechanical arm "and what that entails from an emotional standpoint." In particular, the new villains introduced for the season and their abilities impacted the story in terms of "what that represents against Luke". Each episode of the season is named after a Pete Rock & CL Smooth song, just as Coker named each episode of the first season after a Gang Starr song.

Casting
Colter returns to star as Cage, along with Simone Missick as Misty Knight, Rosario Dawson as Claire Temple, Alfre Woodard as Mariah Dillard, and Theo Rossi as Hernan "Shades" Alvarez. In July 2017, Marvel announced the casting of Mustafa Shakir as John McIver, and Gabrielle Dennis as Tilda Johnson.

Thomas Q. Jones reprises his role as Comanche in the season, along with Danny Johnson as Benjamin Donovan, and Justin Swain as Mark Bailey. In October 2017, it was revealed that Finn Jones would be reprising his role as Danny Rand / Iron Fist in the season. Colter explained that there had been interest from fans to see more of the previously established relationship between Cage and Jessica Jones, but for this season they "went out on a limb" and decided to give to the fans of the "Heroes for Hire" instead by having Cage and Rand team up for part of the season. He added that Finn Jones "will bring some fresh blood in the new season". Jessica Henwick also reprises her Iron Fist role, appearing as Colleen Wing. Following the death of Reg E. Cathey in February 2018, Marvel revealed that his final performance was as Luke Cage's father James Lucas in this season. The character appeared briefly in the first season portrayed by an unnamed actor.

In March 2018, Annabella Sciorra was announced to have been cast in the "key role" of Rosalie Carbone. The next month, Antonique Smith joined the cast as Detective Nandi Tyler, a longtime rival of Misty Knight. Additionally, Elden Henson reprises his role as Foggy Nelson from previous Marvel/Netflix series.

The season also features cameo appearances by ESPN personalities Michael Smith, Jemele Hill, and Stephen A. Smith, and New York Jets head coach Todd Bowles, doubling as the head coach of the fictional Harlem Jets. As Coker is a sports fan, he decided to include the ESPN personalities and was partially motivated to reach out to Michael Smith and Hill out of "professional admiration". Coker noted the additional difficulty in getting the duo to appear because of Marvel's confidentiality requirements, meaning they could not see the scripts beforehand. Dialogue was written for the personalities, though each improvised some of it to make it sound like their own voice. Before reaching out to Bowles, Coker was going to ask David Shaw, head coach of the Stanford University Cardinal football team, since Shaw and Coker were college roommates, but the timing did not work out, as Shaw was recruiting students on the other side of the country. Coker then approached former Jets head coach Herm Edwards, since Edwards had one of Coker's "favorite coach meltdowns of all time", but Edwards also could not coordinate an appearance, resulting Coker approaching Bowles.

Writer, author, and educator Jelani Cobb also cameos in the season, appearing as himself on a talk show speaking to Luke Cage's ability to fix Harlem. Cobb, who has "an ambivalent relationship" to the character of Luke Cage, "went back and forth" on whether he would appear in the season. He noted, "I really like the show and thought it’d be a fun thing to do, but I also think that sometimes it’s important for journalists to keep a separate line from what they’re actually doing versus the imaginary stuff that they’re doing, especially in the era of fake news." Cobb discussed the potential appearances with "some of the people I respect in the field" for their opinion, and after gaining their approval, agreed to appear.

Filming
Principal photography began by June 10, 2017, under the series' working title Tiara. Production wrapped that November.

Music

In July 2017, Colter said that the second season would have "another feel to it" in terms of the music, praising the season's musical guests and explaining that he and Coker had chosen a "certain type" of music for the season after listening to it at a birthday party and agreeing that there had "not been one bad song" played. Coker later explained that the season would explore the roots of hip-hop with blues and reggae, after the first season introduced hip-hop to the MCU. He added that the season would explore "the entire diaspora of black music" along with different cultures. Adrian Younge and Ali Shaheed Muhammad again composed the score for the season, working out of Younge's studio Linear Labs. Their music for the season included a "50-minute epic" for one of the episodes. Coker described the pair as being as "important to the success of the show as anyone in the cast, anyone directing, anyone writing, producing, period."

Coker wanted to have live musical performances in the season again after the first, and hoped that some musicians who had turned him down for the first season would be happy to join the second after getting to see the series. He noted that the idea of performing in the series was not a "home run in terms of the music community" during the first season, and he had to call in a lot of favors from his time as a music journalist to get the performers who did appear. For the second season, he was able to show footage of the first season performances as well as point out where musicians who performed on the show received "immediate streaming bumps" from fans discovering them through the series. With Coker subsequently having his "choice of acts", the season includes live performance from Faith Evans, returning from the first season, along with Joi & D-Nice, Gary Clark Jr., Esperanza Spalding, Christone "Kingfish" Ingram, Ghostface Killah, Stephen Marley, Jadakiss, KRS-One, and Rakim. The latter wrote an original song for the series, which he performs in the season finale. The season also includes music from Nina Simone and Mobb Deep.

Marvel Cinematic Universe tie-ins
Following the death of Captain Ridenhour, high-ranking detective Brigid O'Reilly is mentioned as having recently moved to New Orleans, in reference to that character's role in the series Cloak & Dagger.

Marketing
An advanced screening of the season was hosted by Spotify, Netflix, and the Kennedy Center on June 19, followed by an after-party featuring musical performances by KRS-One, Younge and Muhammad, and surprise guests. The season had its red carpet premiere in New York City on June 21, 2018.

Release
The second season of Luke Cage was released on June 22, 2018, on the streaming service Netflix worldwide, in Ultra HD 4K and high dynamic range. The season, along with the additional Luke Cage season and the other Marvel Netflix series, was removed from Netflix on March 1, 2022, due to Netflix's license for the series ending and Disney regaining the rights. The season became available on Disney+ in the United States, Canada, United Kingdom, Ireland, Australia, and New Zealand on March 16, ahead of its debut in Disney+'s other markets by the end of 2022.

Critical response
The review aggregation website Rotten Tomatoes reported an 85% approval rating, with an average rating of 7.20/10 based on 62 reviews. The website's critical consensus reads, "Marvel's Luke Cage surpasses the successes of its debut season with a satisfyingly complex narrative and a solid ensemble cast led by Alfre Woodard's standout performance as the archvillainess Black Mariah." Metacritic, which uses a weighted average, assigned a score of 64 out of 100 based on 13 critics, indicating "generally favorable reviews".

Awarding the "excellent" season four stars out of five, Olly Richards of Empire said, "Most of Marvel’s superhero series suffer a mid-season sag, without enough plot to fill their episode quota. This season never succumbs to that because it’s not rooted in plot but character. There are episodes where little happens in terms of event, but characters deepen and crack, becoming less who they want to be and more who they have to be, even Luke. Luke Cage could now remove any superhero elements almost entirely and still function as a series." David Betancourt of The Washington Post felt the season was "spectacular, full of unforgettable performances, and has not one but two top-notch villains". Though he felt the season started slow, the later episodes are "where the magic happens". Alison Keene at Collider felt the "last few episodes are fantastic — it just takes a lot to get there." Keene also felt "There are plenty of things this season does well, really well, but there is so much filler and narrative dragging of feet in between that it’s hard to recommend it outright," awarding the season three stars out of four.

CNN's Brian Lowry was more critical of the season, feeling the season was "weaker" than the first, noting it was "not bad, overall, but still experiencing the equivalent of a sophomore slump." Similar to Lowry, Alan Sepinwall at Rolling Stone gave the season two stars out of four, noting the 13-episode season had "only three or four episodes' worth of story at best".

References

External links
 

02
2018 American television seasons